Balbino may refer to:
 Balbino (footballer, born 1896)
 Balbino (footballer, born 1997)